Strength of the Sword 3 (re-released as Strength of the Sword Ultimate) is a third-person, fast-paced, challenge driven, action beat 'em up video game set in a fantasy realm. The game is produced by the small Bulgarian indie game studio Ivent Games for PlayStation 3, with updated versions released for Microsoft Windows, Linux, PlayStation 4 and Xbox One. The story focuses around Strahil, the former leader of the "Upper Kingdom" and the victim of a cruel plot that led to his imprisonment in a dark cave. As Strahil, you will have to advance through four different locations set on the "Island of Dreams" and seek vengeance from the evil figures behind the plot that led to his imprisonment. Throughout his way Strahil will have to deal with brutal enemies who would prefer to die rather than surrender.

Originally a PlayStation Network exclusive, it was released in Europe on June 5, 2013, and December 10, 2013, in North America for PlayStation 3. A Kickstarter campaign in 2015 received the funding to bring the game to more platforms. It was then released as Strength of the Sword Ultimate on August 23, 2019 for PlayStation 4, Xbox One and Windows through the Steam platform.

Reception

Strength of the Sword 3 received mixed reviews from critics upon release. On Metacritic, the game holds a score of 67/100 based on 15 reviews, indicating "mixed or average reviews".

References

External links

2013 video games
Hack and slash games
PlayStation Network games
Video games developed in Bulgaria
PlayStation 3 games
PhyreEngine games
Single-player video games
Wii U games
Windows games
PlayStation 4 games
Linux games
PlayStation Vita games